Dimitrovo may refer to:
Dimitrovo, Russia, name of several rural localities in Russia
Dimitrovo, former name of Pernik, a city in Bulgaria
Dimitrovo, after 1945, name of Ponarth, a suburb/quarter of Königsberg (Kaliningrad)
Former name of Oleksandriiske, Ukraine

See also
Kapitan Dimitrovo, a village in Bulgaria
Dimitrov (disambiguation)